K.A.C Government Junior College is in Nellore, in the Indian state of Andhra Pradesh.

History
The college was established in 1969–1970.

Courses available
 Intermediate education
 Vocational courses

References 

Nellore
Colleges in Andhra Pradesh
Junior colleges in India
1969 establishments in Andhra Pradesh
Educational institutions established in 1969